Bror Flygare (29 November 1888 – 18 August 1943) was a Swedish wrestler. He competed in the lightweight event at the 1912 Summer Olympics.

References

External links
 

1888 births
1943 deaths
Olympic wrestlers of Sweden
Wrestlers at the 1912 Summer Olympics
Swedish male sport wrestlers
Sportspeople from Malmö